This is a list of seasons completed by the Indiana Hoosiers football program since the team's conception in 1885, even though there were no documented games until the 1887 season. The list documents season-by-season records, and conference records from 1900 to the present.

Seasons

References

Indiana

Indiana Hoosiers football seasons